The Polaris 26 is an American trailerable sailboat that was designed by William H. Tripp Jr.  as a cruiser and first built in 1960.

The Polaris 26 is very similar to Tripp's 1963 Sailmaster 26 design.

Production
The design was built by Werf Gusto in the Netherlands, starting in 1960 and imported into the United States by Seafarer Yachts. It was later produced by Seafarer Yachts in their factory in Huntington, New York, but it is now out of production.

Design
The Polaris 26 is a recreational keelboat, built predominantly of fiberglass, with wood trim. It has a masthead sloop rig with wooden spars. The hull has a spooned, raked stem; raised counter, angled transom, a keel-mounted rudder controlled by a tiller and a fixed, modified long keel, with a cutaway forefoot and a retractable centerboard. It displaces .

The boat is fitted with an inboard engine for docking and maneuvering.

The design has sleeping accommodation for four people, with a double "V"-berth in the bow cabin and two straight settee berths in the main cabin around a drop-leaf table. The galley is located on both sides of the companionway ladder. The head is located centered in the bow cabin, underneath the "V"-berth.

See also
List of sailing boat types

References

External links
Photo of a Polaris 26 sailboat

Keelboats
1960s sailboat type designs
Sailing yachts
Trailer sailers
Sailboat type designs by William H. Tripp Jr.
Sailboat types built by Seafarer Yachts
Sailboat types built by Werf Gusto